Monken Hadley is a place in the London Borough of Barnet.

History
The old English place name "Hadley" means "heathery", a woodland clearing which is covered in heather. The prefix "Monken" refers to the fact that the parish was a possession of the monks of Walden Abbey.

The main site of the Battle of Barnet in 1471, one of the two principal engagements of the Wars of the Roses, was in the parish of Monken Hadley. Yorkist troops advanced through the village, although the action took place north (Hadley Wood) and west (Hadley Green) of the settlement. Although the retreat of the forces of Lord William Hastings (at the hands of the Earl of Oxford) took place in the parish of Barnet, all of the other key engagements were within Monken Hadley parish, including the historically significant death of Richard Neville, 16th Earl of Warwick, believed to be at the place where a monument now stands on the Great North Road.

When corrupt lawyer George Booth died in 1726 Hester Pinney had been living with him for three years. She was his only executor. He left her the manor of Monken Hadley twelve miles outside London. Hester died on 19 February 1740 in Holborn.

The 4 August 1827 edition of The Mirror of Literature, Amusement, and Instruction, provides the following short history of the area:

Historically Monken Hadley was a civil parish of Middlesex forming part of a small protrusion into Hertfordshire. In 1889, under the Local Government Act 1888, the civil parish was transferred to Hertfordshire. Under the Local Government Act 1894 the parish was split with a Hadley parish becoming part of the Barnet Urban District, while the remaining part of the parish became part of the East Barnet Urban District of Hertfordshire. In 1965, under the London Government Act 1963, its area was transferred to Greater London and combined with that of other districts formerly in Hertfordshire and Middlesex to form the present-day London Borough of Barnet.

Parish church

The parish church of St Mary the Virgin was built in its present form in 1494 (the date being carved in stone over the west door) although a church is believed to have stood on the site for more than 800 years. The present building is in the perpendicular style, and includes two side chapels (in transepts) dedicated to St Anne and St Catherine. The building was heavily renovated in Victorian times, and contains large quantities of Victorian woodwork furniture. The parish and church were heavily influenced by tractarianism and the Oxford Movement, and it remains a focus of eucharistic worship within the surrounding district.

Sport and recreation

Monken Hadley has a Non-League football team Hadley F.C. who play at their Brickfield Lane ground in nearby Arkley.

Monken Hadley has a King George's Fields open space in memorial to King George V. It is popular for tobogganing when there has been a good fall of snow  The field descends into the Hadley Woods, which make their way into the Tudor Sports Ground area. Hadley Green is a Local Nature Reserve which is a Site of Metropolitan Importance, and traditionally considered the main site of the Battle of Barnet.

Hadley Common has a cricket field, home to a well-known cricket club, Monken Hadley CC, which is mentioned in one of the works of Anthony Trollope, who lived in Monken Hadley.

Famous residents
The great adversarial lawyer Sir William Garrow (1760–1840), coiner of the phrase "innocent until proven guilty", was born and brought up in the village.
Sir Roger Wilbraham (1553–1616), Solicitor-General for Ireland, lived here towards the end of his life and is buried here, and the family monument can still be seen in the Church of St Mary the Virgin. He founded the local Wilbraham's Almshouses.
Anthony Upton, a High Court judge in Ireland,  was born here in 1656.
The writers Kingsley Amis and Elizabeth Jane Howard lived for a time in Lemmons, a house near the Common, where their friend the Poet Laureate Cecil Day-Lewis died.
Spike Milligan (1918–2002), Comedian, lived at Monkenhurst, 1974-2002.

Transport links

Buses

Monken Hadley and Hadley Green are not well-served by bus routes, with most services terminating further south in Barnet. The two Transport for London routes which run nearby are:

84 – New Barnet railway station to St Albans
399 – Barnet (the Spires) to Hadley Wood railway station – circular service; Monday to Saturday shopping hours only.

Railway
Both fairly nearby are:

New Barnet railway station –  Great Northern
Hadley Wood railway station –  Great Northern

Tube
Two tube stations are relatively nearby:

 High Barnet (Northern Line) is the closer of the two and lies to the south, within walking distance (under a mile), and is accessible via the 84 bus. 
 Cockfosters (Piccadilly Line) is accessible via a longer walk, nearly three miles, eastwards across Monken Hadley Common.

Geographic location

See also
Battle of Barnet
Hadley Brewery
Hadley Green
King George's Fields
List of listed buildings in Hadley
Monken Hadley Common

References

Further reading
 Gelder, W.H.: Georgian Hadley, Barnet Press, 1974

External links

Monken Hadley Parish Church website
Monken Hadley Cricket Club website
Archives relating to Monken Hadley at The National Archives (United Kingdom)

 
Districts of the London Borough of Barnet
Areas of London
Places formerly in Middlesex